Tamás Harangozó (born 27 June 1979) is a Hungarian jurist and politician, member of the National Assembly from the Hungarian Socialist Party's Tolna County Regional List since 2010. His brother is Gábor Harangozó another MP from the Socialist Party.

Harangozó was a member of the Constitutional, Judicial and Standing Orders Committee between 14 May 2010 and 14 November 2011. He was appointed a member of the Defence and Internal Security Committee on 17 May 2010 and Committee on National Security on 14 November 2011.

Personal life
He is married. His wife is Emese Horváczy. He has two daughters, Réka and Luca.

References

1979 births
Living people
University of Pécs alumni
Hungarian jurists
Hungarian Socialist Party politicians
Members of the National Assembly of Hungary (2010–2014)
Members of the National Assembly of Hungary (2014–2018)
Members of the National Assembly of Hungary (2018–2022)
Members of the National Assembly of Hungary (2022–2026)
People from Dunaújváros